Al-Qaswa is an armoured personnel carrier (APC) variant of the APC Talha. Designed for logistics roles, the vehicle can carry 6 tonnes of military supplies in its cargo compartment across all types of cross-country terrain (see Geography of Pakistan). The first prototype of the Al Qaswa was completed in 2002 but as far as it is known the vehicle has yet to enter quantity production. The Al Qaswa logistic vehicle has six road wheels on each side which gives the vehicle greater volume and payload compared with some other variants.

Users include:

Pakistan Army: 200 to be procured.

References

Armoured personnel carriers